is a mythical horse from a collection of Japanese folklore known as the Chronicles of Japan or Nihon-Shoki (日本書紀). In the myth, Ama no Fuchigoma was ridden by the god Susanoo.

References

Japanese mythology
Horses in mythology
Japanese legendary creatures